Alfred Gwynne Vanderbilt Jr. (September 22, 1912 – November 12, 1999) was a British-born member of the prominent Vanderbilt railroad family, and a noted figure of American thoroughbred horse racing. He was the youngest-ever member of The Jockey Club, President of Belmont Racetrack, New York, and Pimlico Race Course, Baltimore, and Chairman of the Board of the New York Racing Association. In World War II, he was decorated for bravery in the South Pacific.

Noted family; early years
Vanderbilt was a son of the first Alfred Gwynne Vanderbilt, who died a hero in the sinking of the RMS Lusitania. His mother, Margaret Emerson (daughter of the Bromo-Seltzer inventor Isaac Edward Emerson), was one of America's wealthiest women and most sought-after hostesses, operating at least seven large estates around the country. His grandfather, Cornelius Vanderbilt II, had been one of America's most revered businessmen; his great-grandfather, William Henry Vanderbilt had been the richest man in the world. "Commodore" Cornelius Vanderbilt started the family fortune in shipping and railroads as the founder of the New York Central Railroad and builder of Grand Central Depot (built 1869–1871), the precursor to Grand Central Terminal, built on approximately the same location, and completed by Cornelius II in 1913.

Alfred Gwynne Vanderbilt Jr. was born to American parents in London, England. He was educated at St. Paul's School and at Yale, where he entered with the class of 1935, but did not graduate. His mother, Margaret Emerson (1884–1960), gave him a 600-acre (2.4 km²) horse farm in Glyndon, Maryland, called Sagamore Farm, for his 21st birthday, and it was in thoroughbred horse racing that he made his mark. The Vanderbilt family had by then given up control of most of their former railroad interests. Alfred G. Vanderbilt was President of Belmont Racetrack in New York and was the principal owner and president of Pimlico Race Course in Baltimore.

When he was called into service for World War II, he captained a PT boat in the South Pacific, earning the Silver Star for bravery.  He was promoted to lieutenant, junior grade on March 2, 1944.  On his discharge, he returned to racing in a major way.

Thoroughbred racing
Vanderbilt was one of the original members of the Westchester Racing Association and a driving force behind thoroughbred racing in America for most of the 20th century. His mother, Margaret Emerson, took him to his first race, the Preakness Stakes, in 1922. He often said, "After that, I was hooked." On his 21st birthday, his mother gifted him Sagamore Farm, her racing operation in Reisterstown, Maryland, which had been left to her by her father, Isaac Emerson, who was the inventor of Bromo-Seltzer and founder of the Emerson Drug Company, which later became Warner-Lambert.

Vanderbilt personally oversaw the breeding and training of his stable. He bought Pimlico Race Course and was President of Pimlico twice, the first time when he was 20. As a stable owner, his first major acquisition was Discovery, one of the great handicap horses of the age who became his foundation sire.

Vanderbilt was elected to The Jockey Club as the youngest member in its history in 1935 and eventually campaigned four national champions: Discovery, Next Move, Bed O' Roses and Native Dancer. During the late 1930s and early 1940s, he owned and ran Pimlico Racetrack outside Baltimore and arranged the famous match race between Seabiscuit and War Admiral in 1938. He was President of Belmont Park and Pimlico at the same time before joining the Navy. During the Second World War, he captained a PT boat in the South Pacific and was awarded the Silver Star for bravery under fire. He then returned to racing, bringing his greatest champion, Native Dancer, to the track in 1952. Native Dancer won all 9 starts as a 2-year-old and was named Horse of the Year. He won every start as a three-year-old too, except the Kentucky Derby, which he lost by a head to Cain Hoy Stable's Dark Star. However, Native Dancer was named 3-year-old Male Champion and was Horse of the Year again in his 4th year. All told, he won 21 of 22 starts, with the single second-place finish in the 1953 Kentucky Derby his only career loss. Many consider the Grey Ghost of Sagamore to have been the first Thoroughbred television star, and TV Guide ranked him as a top icon of the era".

Vanderbilt continued racing throughout his life and served as Chairman of the Board of the New York Racing Association from 1971 to 1975. The New York Turf Writers voted him "The Man Who Did The Most for Racing" a record four times, posthumously renaming the award in his honor.

Personal life
Vanderbilt was married three times. His first marriage was in 1938 to Manuela Mercedes Hudson (1920–1978), a niece of racehorse owner Charles S. Howard. The couple separated and began living apart in December 1940. Before their divorce in 1942, they were the parents of:

 Wendy Maria Vanderbilt (1939–2016), an artist who married Orin Lehman (1920–2008), the long-serving commissioner of the New York State Office of Parks and Recreation.

His second marriage was on October 13, 1945, to Jeanne Lourdes Murray (1919–2013), a sister of Catherine Murray di Montezemolo and granddaughter of Thomas E. Murray. Before their divorce in 1956, they were the parents of:

 Heidi Murray Vanderbilt (1948–2021), who married Jones Harris (b. 1929), the son of actors Ruth Gordon and Jed Harris, in 1971.  They had a son named Jack Harris in 1972. Heidi made her Broadway debut in 1965 in Gordon's A Very Rich Woman, along with Katharine Houghton. She published her first novel, The Scar Rule, on her 72nd birthday. 
 Alfred Gwynne Vanderbilt III (b. 1949), who married Alison Campbell Platten in 1971. He is the father of screenwriter James Vanderbilt.

In 1957, he married for the third time to Jean Harvey (b. 1937) of the Cudahy meat-packing empire. Before their eventual divorce in 1975, they were the parents of:

 Nicholas Harvey Vanderbilt (1958–1984), who went missing on Mount Robson in British Columbia, and was presumed dead.
 Victoria Emerson Vanderbilt (b. 1959), who married James Weiss.
 Michael Daggett Vanderbilt (b. 1967), who was born in Saratoga Springs, New York.

He died November 12, 1999, at his home in Mill Neck, New York after attending the morning racehorse workouts, two months after his 87th birthday.  He was buried in the Vanderbilt Mausoleum on Staten Island, New York.

In popular culture
In the early 1950s, he was a regular panelist on the NBC game show Who Said That? along with H. V. Kaltenborn, Boris Karloff, and American actress Dagmar.

See also

 Vanderbilt family

References

External links
 Brief profile of Alfred G. Vanderbilt at the NYRA

1912 births
1999 deaths
Yale University alumni
United States Navy personnel of World War II
American racehorse owners and breeders
New York Racing Association executives
American socialites
American people of Dutch descent
Alfred Gwynne
United States Navy officers
Recipients of the Silver Star
People from Brookville, New York
20th-century American businesspeople
American expatriates in the United Kingdom
Burials at the Vanderbilt Family Cemetery and Mausoleum